The 45th Cannes Film Festival was held from 7 to 18 May 1992. The Palme d'Or went to the Den goda viljan by Bille August.

The festival opened with Basic Instinct, directed by Paul Verhoeven and closed with Far and Away, directed by Ron Howard.

Juries

Main competition
The following people were appointed as the Jury of the 1992 feature film competition:
Gérard Depardieu (France) Jury President
John Boorman (United Kingdom)
Carlo Di Palma (Italy)
Jamie Lee Curtis (USA)
Joële Van Effenterre (France)
Lester James Peries (Sri Lanka)
Nana Djordjadze (Georgia)
Pedro Almodóvar (Spain)
René Cleitman (France)
Serge Toubiana (France)

Camera d'Or
The following people were appointed as the Jury of the 1992 Camera d'Or:
 André Delvaux (director) (Belgium) President
 David Meeker (foreign delegate) (United Kingdom)
 Gérard Mordillat (director) (France)
 Gian Piero Brunetta (journalist) (Italy)
 Joao Lopes (journalist) (Portugal)
 Olivier Bauer (actor) (France)
 Pierre Favre (critic) (France)
 Richard Hasselmann (cinephile) (France)

Official selection

In competition - Feature film
The following feature films competed for the Palme d'Or:

 A Stranger Among Us by Sidney Lumet
 Basic Instinct by Paul Verhoeven
 The Best Intentions by Bille August
 Crush by Alison Maclean
 Dark at Noon by Raúl Ruiz
 Dream of Light by Víctor Erice
 In the Country of Juliets by Mehdi Charef
 An Independent Life by Vitali Kanevsky
 The Journey by Fernando Solanas
 Howards End by James Ivory
 Hyènes by Djibril Diop Mambéty
 The Sentinel by Arnaud Desplechin
 The Long Day Closes by Terence Davies
 Luna Park by Pavel Lungin
 Léolo by Jean-Claude Lauzon
 Of Mice and Men by Gary Sinise
 The Player by Robert Altman
 The Return of Casanova by Édouard Niermans
 Simple Men by Hal Hartley
 The Stolen Children by Gianni Amelio
 Twin Peaks: Fire Walk with Me by David Lynch

Un Certain Regard
The following films were selected for the competition of Un Certain Regard:

 American Me by Edward James Olmos
 Apple Trees (Apfelbäume) by Helma Sanders-Brahms
 The Arrival of Averill (Averills Ankommen) by Michael Schottenberg
 Bad Lieutenant by Abel Ferrara
 Being at Home with Claude by Jean Beaudin
 The Blue Eyes of Yonta (Udju Azul di Yonta) by Flora Gomes
 The Chekist (Tchekiste) by Aleksandr Rogozhkin
 Cousin Bobby by Jonathan Demme
 Crystal Nights (Krystallines nyhtes) by Tonia Marketaki
 Happy Days (Schastlivye dni) by Aleksei Balabanov
 Life, and Nothing More... (Zendegi va digar hich) by Abbas Kiarostami
 Memory of Water (La memoria del agua) by Héctor Fáver
 Modern Crimes by Alejandro Agresti
 Mon Desir by Nicky Marshall
 The Ox (Oxen) by Sven Nykvist
 Prague by Ian Sellar
 Strictly Ballroom by Baz Luhrmann
 The Summer Guest (A nyaraló) by Can Togay
 Through an Open Window by Eric Mendelsohn
 Wedding Night – End of the Song (Hochzaeitsnuecht) by Pol Cruchten

Films out of competition
The following films were selected to be screened out of competition:

 As in Heaven (Svo á jörðu sem á himni) by Kristín Jóhannesdóttir
 Le Batteur Du Boléro by Patrice Leconte
 Beauty and the Beast by Gary Trousdale, Kirk Wise
 The Boys from St. Petri (Drengene fra Sankt Petri) by Søren Kragh-Jacobsen
 Far and Away by Ron Howard
 House of Angels (Änglagård) by Colin Nutley
 Map of the Human Heart by Vincent Ward
 The Oak (Balanţa) by Lucian Pintilie
 Opening Night by John Cassavetes
 Othello by Orson Welles
 Pather Panchali by Satyajit Ray
 Patrick Dewaere by Marc Esposito
 Reservoir Dogs by Quentin Tarantino
 Sarafina! by Darrell James Roodt
 The Warrior's Heart (Krigerens hjerte) by Leidulv Risan

Short film competition
The following short films competed for the Short Film Palme d'Or:

 Az út by Nikolai Ivanov Neikov
 Cheating, Inc. by William Lorton
 Daumier's Law by Geoff Dunbar
 L'échange by Vincent Pérez
 Encolure 42 by Willy Kempeneers
 Ghalb by Sa'ied Mojaveri
 Keine besonderen Vorkommnisse by Jürgen Schönhoff
 Le métro by Catherine Montondo
 No Problem by Craig Welch
 Omnibus by Sam Karmann
 A Passion Play by Tony Twigg
 La sensation by Manuel Poutte

Parallel sections

International Critics' Week
The following films were screened for the 31st International Critics' Week (31e Semaine de la Critique):

Feature film competition

 Adorable Lies (Adorables mentiras) by Gerardo Chijona (Cuba)
 Anmonaito no sasayaki wo kiita by Isao Yamada (Japan)
 Archipiélago by Pablo Perelman (Chile)
 Die flucht by David Rühm (Austria)
 The Grocer’s Wife by John Pozer (Canada)
 Ingalo by Asdis Thorrodsen (Iceland)
 Man Bites Dog (C’est arrivé près de chez vous) by Rémy Belvaux, André Bonzel, Benoît Poelvoorde (Belgium)

Short film competition

 Floating by Richard Heslop (United Kingdom)
 Home Stories by Matthias Müller (Germany)
 Les Marionnettes by Marc Chevrie (France) 
 Le Petit chat est mort by Fejria Deliba (France)
 Revolver by Chester Dent (United Kingdom)
 The Room by Jeff Balsmeyer (United States)
 Sprickan by Kristian Petri (Sweden)

Directors' Fortnight
The following films were screened for the 1992 Directors' Fortnight (Quinzaine des Réalizateurs):

 Am Ende der Nacht by Christoph Schaub
 Le Amiche del cuore by Michele Placido
 Angel of Fire (Angel de fuego) by Dana Rotberg
 Archipel by Pierre Granier-Deferre
 Baduk by Majid Majidi
 Benny’s Video by Michael Haneke
 Bob Roberts by Tim Robbins
 Les contes sauvages by Gérald Calderon, Jean-Charles Cuttoli
 Coupable d’innocence by Marcin Ziębiński
 Don Quijote by Orson Welles, Jesús Franco
 Dust of Angels by Hsu Hsiao-ming
 Eux by Levan Zakareishvili
 Hay Que Zurrar A Los Pobres by Santiago San Miguel
  by Rudolf Thome
 Love (Lyubov) by Valery Todorovsky
 Mac by John Turturro
 My New Gun by Stacy Cochran
 Otrazheniye v zerkale by Svetlana Proskurina
 Le Petit Prince a dit by Christine Pascal
 Quelque part vers Conakry by Françoise Ebrard
 Sans un cri by Jeanne Labrune
 Vagabond by Ann Le Monnier
 Warszawa. Année 5703 by Janusz Kijowski

Short films

 L’autre Célia by Irène Jouannet
 F.X. Messerschmidt sculpteur (1736-1783) by Marino Vagliano
 Juliette by Didier Bivel
 Le Trou de la corneille by François Hanss
 Léa by Christophe Debuisne
 Pilotes by Olivier Zagar
 Versailles Rive Gauche by Bruno Podalydès
 Voleur d’images by Bruno Victor-Pujebet

Awards

Official awards
The following films and people received the 1992 Official selection awards:
Palme d'Or: The Best Intentions (Den goda viljan) by Bille August
Grand Prize of the Jury: The Stolen Children (Il ladro di bambini) by Gianni Amelio
Best Director: Robert Altman for The Player
Best Actress: Pernilla August for The Best Intentions (Den goda viljan)
Best Actor: Tim Robbins for The Player
Jury Prize:
Dream of Light (El sol del membrillo) by Víctor Erice
An Independent Life (Samostoyatelnaya zhizn) by Vitali Kanevsky
45th Anniversary Prize: Howards End by James Ivory
Golden Camera
Caméra d'Or: Mac by John Turturro
Short films
Short Film Palme d'Or: Omnibus by Sam Karmann

Independent awards
FIPRESCI Prize
 Dream of Light (El sol del membrillo) by Víctor Erice
Commission Supérieure Technique
 Technical Grand Prize: Fernando Solanas (for technical visual and aural excellence) in The Journey (El viaje)
Ecumenical Jury
 Prize of the Ecumenical Jury: The Stolen Children (Il ladro di bambini) by Gianni Amelio
 Ecumenical Jury - Special Mention:
In the Country of Juliets (Au pays des Juliets) by Mehdi Charef
The Journey (El viaje) by Fernando Solanas
Award of the Youth
Foreign Film: Strictly Ballroom by Baz Luhrmann
French Film: Sans un cri by Jeanne Labrune
Special Award of the Youth: Man Bites Dog (C'est arrivé près de chez vous) by Rémy Belvaux, André Bonzel, Benoît Poelvoorde
Awards in the frame of International Critics' Week
SACD Award
Best Short: The Room by Jeff Balsmeyer
Best Feature: Man Bites Dog (C’est arrivé près de chez vous) by Rémy Belvaux, André Bonzel, Benoît Poelvoorde
 Canal+ Award: Floating by Richard Heslop

References

Media
INA: Opening of the 1992 Festival (commentary in French)

External links

1992 Cannes Film Festival (web.archive)
Official website Retrospective 1992 
Cannes Film Festival Awards for 1992 at Internet Movie Database

Cannes Film Festival
Cannes Film Festival
Cannes Film Festival
Cannes